Bobby Caldwell (reissued on CD as What You Won't Do for Love) is the debut album by singer and songwriter Bobby Caldwell. The album was released in 1978 on the Clouds imprint of TK Records.

Track listing

Personnel 
 Bobby Caldwell – all vocals, keyboards, synthesizers, guitars, bass
 Benny Latimore – keyboards
 Alfons Kettner – guitars
 Steve Mele – guitars
 George "Chocolate" Perry– bass
 Richie Velazquez – bass
 Andy Newmark – drums
 Ed Greene – drums
 Harold Seay – drums
 Joe Galdo – drums
 Mark Colby – saxophones 
 Chris Colclessor – saxophones, clarinet
 Mike Lewis – saxophones, horn and string arrangements 
 Gary Lindsay – clarinet 
 James Marshall – trombone 
 Hollis Burridge – trumpet, flugelhorn
 Jeff Kievit – trumpet, flugelhorn 

Production
 Marsha Radcliffe – producer (1, 2)
 Ann Holloway – producer (3, 5-9)
 George "Chocolate" Perry – producer (4)

Charts

Weekly charts

Year-end charts

Singles

References

External links
 

1978 debut albums
Soul albums by American artists
TK Records albums